Luis Miguel Nlavo Asué (born 30 November 2002) is an Equatoguinean footballer who plays as a forward for the under-23 team of Portuguese club SC Braga and the Equatorial Guinea national team.

International career
Nlavo made his international debut for Equatorial Guinea on 28 July 2019. In August 2019 he was recalled to the national team.

International goals
Scores and results list Equatorial Guinea's goal tally first.

References

External links

2002 births
Living people
Sportspeople from Malabo
Equatoguinean footballers
Association football forwards
Cano Sport Academy players
S.C. Braga players
Campeonato de Portugal (league) players
Equatorial Guinea youth international footballers
Equatorial Guinea international footballers
Equatoguinean expatriate footballers
Equatoguinean expatriate sportspeople in Portugal
Expatriate footballers in Portugal
2021 Africa Cup of Nations players